Nevil may refer to:

Surname:
Alex Nevil (born 1965), American actor and younger brother of Robbie Nevil
Dwight Nevil (born 1944), American professional golfer
Robbie Nevil (born 1958), American pop singer-songwriter/producer/guitarist

Given name:
Nevil Brownjohn GBE KCB CMG MC (1897–1973), Quartermaster-General to the Forces
Nevil Dede (born 1975), Tirana's current coach and a former football defender
Nevil Macready, GCMG, KCB, PC (Ire) (1862–1946), British Army officer
John Nevil Maskelyne (1839–1917), English stage magician and inventor of the pay toilet
Nevil Maskelyne FRS (1732–1811), the fifth English Astronomer Royal
Nevil Maskelyne (magician) (1863–1924), British magician and inventor
Nevil Story Maskelyne (1823–1911), English geologist and politician
Henry Nevil Payne (died 1710), dramatist and agitator for the Roman Catholic cause in Scotland and England
Nevil Shed, American basketball player
Nevil Shute (1899–1960), British novelist and aeronautical engineer
Nevil Sidgwick (1873–1952), English theoretical chemist who contributed to the theory of valency and chemical bonding

See also
 Nevill (disambiguation)
Neville (disambiguation)
 Nevills (disambiguation)